Maria Bocharova (also spelled Mariia Bocharova; ; born 23 February 2002) is a Russian beach volleyball player. Partnered with Maria Voronina, she is the 2018 Youth Olympic champion among girls.

Career 

Bocharova was a member of the Obninsk beach volleyball school for eight years and she was coached under Elena Masalyova.[7][8]

Bocharova and her teammate Maria Voronina won the European Junior Championships U18 and U20 in 2017 and in 2018 they won the FIVB Beach Volleyball U19 World Championships.[9][10]

At 2018 Summer Youth Olympics the Voronina–Bocharova duet made it to the final, they beat a couple from Italy Scampoli–Bertozzi (21:19, 21:19) and won the championship.[11]

At 2019 Beach Volleyball U21 World Championship the Voronina–Bocharova duet made it to the final, but lost to a couple from Brazil Victoria-Vitoria in a difficult dramatic tie-break match:

Russia-Brazil(1-2(21-17;15-21;13-15))
It was the first major failure.

References

External links 
 
 
 

2002 births
Living people
Russian beach volleyball players
Russian women's volleyball players
Beach volleyball players at the 2018 Summer Youth Olympics
Youth Olympic gold medalists for Russia
21st-century Russian women